Nick Crowe may refer to:

 Nick Crowe (artist) (born 1968), English artist
 Nick Crowe (sidecar racer), British sidecar racer